Lieselotte Breker (born 15 February 1960 in Hanau, died 20 July 2022) was a German sport shooter. She competed in pistol shooting events at the Summer Olympics in 1988 and 1992.

Olympic results

References

1960 births
Living people
ISSF pistol shooters
German female sport shooters
Shooters at the 1988 Summer Olympics
Shooters at the 1992 Summer Olympics
Olympic shooters of West Germany
Olympic shooters of Germany
Sportspeople from Hanau